Takewaka may refer to
Takekawa Station, a railway station on the Chichibu Main Line in Fukaya, Saitama, Japan
Yukihide Takekawa (born 1952), Japanese singer-songwriter

See also
Takewaka, a surname

Japanese-language surnames